Raynick Damasco (born 7 March 1991) is a Curaçaoan former international footballer who played as a defender.

Club career
Damasco has played professionally for Vitesse and AGOVV. He later played on amateur level for JOS Watergraafsmeer and HBOK between 2013 and 2018.

International career
He made his international debut for Curaçao in 2011, and has appeared in FIFA World Cup qualifying matches.

References

1991 births
Living people
Footballers from Amsterdam
Dutch people of Curaçao descent
Association football defenders
Dutch footballers
Curaçao footballers
Curaçao international footballers
AGOVV Apeldoorn players
Eerste Divisie players
SBV Vitesse players
JOS Watergraafsmeer players